The Quebec Major Junior Hockey League (abbreviated QMJHL in English, LHJMQ in French) is one of the three major junior ice hockey leagues that constitute the Canadian Hockey League. The league includes teams in the provinces of Quebec, Nova Scotia, New Brunswick, and Prince Edward Island.

The President's Cup is the championship trophy of the league. The QMJHL champion then goes on to compete in the Memorial Cup against the OHL and WHL champions, and the CHL host team. The QMJHL had traditionally adopted a rapid and offensive style of hockey. Former QMJHL players hold many of the Canadian Hockey League's career and single season offensive records.

Hockey Hall of Fame alumni of the QMJHL include Mario Lemieux, Guy Lafleur, Ray Bourque, Pat LaFontaine, Mike Bossy, Denis Savard, Michel Goulet, Luc Robitaille, and goaltenders Patrick Roy and Martin Brodeur.

Member teams

History
The Quebec Major Junior Hockey League was founded in 1969, through the merger of best teams from the existing Quebec Junior Hockey League and the Metropolitan Montreal Junior Hockey League, declaring themselves a "major junior" league. Of the original eleven QMJHL teams, eight came from the QJHL, two from the MMJHL, and the Cornwall Royals, from Cornwall, Ontario, near the Quebec border, who transferred from the Central Junior A Hockey League. The Rosemont National and Laval Saints transferred from the MMJHL. The eight teams from the QJHL were the Drummondville Rangers, Quebec Remparts, Saint-Jérôme Alouettes, Shawinigan Bruins, Sherbrooke Castors, Sorel Éperviers, Trois-Rivières Ducs and the Verdun Maple Leafs.

Most of the teams were within a few hours' drive of Montreal. From the first season in 1969–70, only Shawinigan remains in the same city with an uninterrupted history, although the team's name has changed to the Cataractes.

In 1972 the QMJHL had been in operation for three years, and wanted a team in the province's largest city. It threatened a lawsuit to force the Montreal Junior Canadiens of the Ontario Hockey Association into the Quebec-based league. Over the summer of 1972, the OHA granted the Junior Habs a "one-year suspension" of operations, while team ownership transferred the team and players into the QMJHL, renaming themselves the Montreal Bleu Blanc Rouge in the process. The OHA then reactivated the suspended franchise for the 1973–74 season in Kingston, Ontario, under new ownership and with new players, calling the team the Kingston Canadians. 
 
QMJHL teams have won the Memorial Cup twelve times since 1969, with the Shawinigan Cataractes, Saint John Sea Dogs, the Granby Prédateurs, the Hull Olympiques, Halifax Mooseheads, Rouyn-Noranda Huskies, Rimouski Océanic, and the Acadie-Bathurst Titan each winning once, the Quebec Remparts winning twice (once in their first edition 1969–1985, and once in their second edition 1997–present) and the Cornwall Royals winning three times.

Starting in 1994, the QMJHL began to expand further east, outside of Quebec. The "Q" filled the void in Atlantic Canada after the exodus of American Hockey League franchises, when the AHL had a strong presence in the 1980s and 1990s; all of the Maritime Division cities save for Bathurst, New Brunswick are former homes of AHL franchises. To date, Fredericton, New Brunswick is the lone former AHL market that has not established a QMJHL franchise.

In recent seasons, the QMJHL has been scouting players from the Atlantic Canada region along with a surge in players coming out of the New England area: the QMJHL has territorial rights to draft and recruit players from New England as part of an agreement where players from the United States can be drafted by the CHL league that is in a similar geographic area.

Retired numbers

League presidents
 Robert Lebel (1969–1975)
 Jean Rougeau (1981–1983)
 Paul Dumont (1983–1984)
 Gilles Courteau (1986–2023)

Canadian Hockey League records
This is a list of Canadian Hockey League career and single season records accomplished by QMJHL players.

Most goals, career
1st – 309 – Mike Bossy, Laval National (1972–77)
2nd – 281 – Stephane Lebeau, Shawinigan Cataractes (1984–88)
3rd – 278 – Normand Dupont, Montreal Bleu Blanc Rouge, Montreal Juniors (1973–77)

Most assists, career
1st – 408 – Patrice Lefebvre, Shawinigan Cataractes (1984–88)
3rd – 346 – Patrick Emond, Trois-Rivières Draveurs, Hull Olympiques, Chicoutimi Saguenéens (1981–86)
7th – 315 – Mario Lemieux, Laval Voisins (1981–84)

Most points, career
1st – 595 – Patrice Lefebvre, Shawinigan Cataractes (1984–88)
3rd – 580 – Stephane Lebeau, Shawinigan Cataractes (1984–88)
4th – 575 – Patrick Emond, Trois-Rivières Draveurs, Hull Olympiques, Chicoutimi Saguenéens (1981–86)

Most goals, one season
1st – 133 – Mario Lemieux, Laval Voisins, 1983–84 (70 games)
2nd – 130 – Guy Lafleur, Quebec Remparts, 1970–71 (62 games)
4th – 104 – Pat LaFontaine, Verdun Juniors, 1982–83 (70 games)
5th – 103 – Guy Lafleur, Quebec Remparts, 1969–70 (56 games)
6th – 100 – Gary MacGregor, Cornwall Royals, 1973–74 (66 games)

Most assists, one season
1st – 157 – Pierre Larouche, Sorel Éperviers, 1973–74 (70 games)
2nd – 149 – Mario Lemieux, Laval Voisins, 1983–84 (70 games)
3rd – 136 – Patrice Lefebvre, Shawinigan Cataractes, 1987–88 (70 games)
5th – 135 – Michel Deziel, Sorel Éperviers, 1973–74 (69 games)
5th – 135 – Marc Fortier, Chicoutimi Saguenéens, 1986–87 (65 games)

Most points, one season
1st – 282 – Mario Lemieux, Laval Voisins, 1983–84 (70 games)
2nd – 251 – Pierre Larouche, Sorel Éperviers, 1973–74 (67 games)
3rd – 234 – Pat LaFontaine, Verdun Juniors, 1982–83 (70 games)
4th – 227 – Michel Deziel, Sorel Éperviers, 1973–74 (69 games)
5th – 216 – Real Cloutier, Quebec Remparts, 1973–74 (69 games)
6th – 214 – Jacques Cossette, Sorel Éperviers, 1973–74 (68 games)
8th – 209 – Guy Lafleur, Quebec Remparts, 1970–71 (62 games)
9th – 206 – Jacques Locas, Quebec Remparts, 1973–74 (63 games)
10th – 201 – Marc Fortier, Chicoutimi Saguenéens, 1986–87 (65 games)
11th – 200 – Patrice Lefebvre, Shawinigan Cataractes, 1987–88 (70 games)

Timeline of teams

 

This is a complete list of team histories since 1969.
1969– First season, 2 divisions. East: Quebec City Remparts, Shawinigan Bruins, Drummondville Rangers, Sorel Éperviers (Black Hawks), Trois-Rivières Ducs (Dukes), and Sherbrooke Castors (Beavers). West: Saint-Jérôme Alouettes, Cornwall Royals, Rosemont National, Verdun Maple Leafs, and Laval Saints.
1970– Divisions dissolved, Laval folds.
1971– Rosemont National move to Laval.
1972– The Saint-Jérôme Alouettes and the Verdun Maple Leafs fold. The Montreal Junior Canadiens franchise of the OHA transfers to QMJHL, becoming the Montreal Bleu Blanc Rouge.
1973– League split into two divisions. East: Sorel, Quebec, Shawinigan, Trois-Rivières, Chicoutimi; West: Cornwall, Montreal, Sherbrooke, Laval, Drummondville, Hull. Chicoutimi Saguenéens, and the Hull Festivals granted franchises. Shawinigan Bruins become Shawinigan Dynamos.
1974– Drummondville Rangers fold, Trois-Rivières Ducs become Trois-Rivières Draveurs (Lumberjacks).
1975– Montreal Bleu Blanc Rouge became Montreal Juniors.
1976– Hull Festivals became Hull Olympiques. Divisions renamed: East becomes Dilio, West becomes Lebel.
1977– Sorel Éperviers (Black Hawks) move to Verdun. Sherbrooke moved to Dilio Division, while Verdun played in the Lebel.
1978– Shawinigan Dynamos became Shawinigan Cataractes.
1979– Verdun Éperviers (Black Hawks) became Sorel/Verdun Éperviers. Laval National become Laval Voisins.
1980– Sorel/Verdun Éperviers became Sorel Éperviers.
1981– Divisions cease to exist, Cornwall moved to the OHL, Sorel Éperviers moved to Granby and became the Bisons.
1982– Lebel and Dilio Divisions reintroduced. Shawinigan, Chicoutimi, Trois-Rivières, Quebec, and Drummondville played in the Dilio, while Laval, Verdun, Longueuil, Saint-Jean, Hull, and Granby played in the Lebel. Sherbrooke Castors moved to Saint-Jean. Montreal Juniors moved to Verdun. Drummondville Voltigeurs (Infantrymen) granted a franchise, Longueuil Chevaliers (Cavaliers) granted a franchise.
1984– Plattsburgh Pioneers granted a franchise, but fold three months into the schedule after playing 17 games. They played in the Lebel Division, Granby is moved to the Dilio. Verdun Juniors become the Verdun Junior Canadiens.
1985– Quebec Remparts fold. Laval Voisins became Laval Titan.
1987– Longueuil Chevaliers moved to Victoriaville and became the Tigres. They played in the Dilio. Granby was moved to the Lebel Division.
1988– Divisions ceased to exist, Longueuil Collège-Français are granted the rights to resurrect the Quebec Remparts franchise.
1989– Verdun Junior Canadiens moved to Saint-Hyacinthe and became the Laser. Saint-Jean Castors became St-Jean Lynx.
1990– Lebel and Dilio divisions created yet again: Chicoutimi, Trois-Rivières, Drummondville, Shawinigan, Beauport, and Victoriaville play in the Dilio; Longueuil, Hull, Laval, Saint-Hyacinthe, Granby, and Saint-Jean played in the Lebel. Beauport Harfangs was granted a franchise.
1991– Longueuil Collège-Français moved to Verdun.
1992– Trois-Rivières Draveurs moved to Sherbrooke and became the Faucons.
1993– Val-d'Or granted a franchise, named the Foreurs. They played in the Lebel.
1994– Verdun Collège-Français folded.  Halifax awarded an expansion team, the Mooseheads. Halifax played in the Dilio. Laval Titan became Laval Titan Collège-Français.
1995– Saint-Jean Lynx moved to Rimouski and become the Océanic. Moncton Alpines franchise granted. Rimouski and Moncton both played in the Dilio. Drummondville and Sherbrooke moved to the Lebel. Granby Bisons became Granby Prédateurs.
1996– Saint-Hyacinthe Laser moved to Rouyn-Noranda and became the Huskies. Moncton Alpines became Moncton Wildcats.
1997– Granby Prédateurs move to Cape Breton and became the Screaming Eagles. They played in the Dilio. Shawinigan moved to the Lebel. The Beauport Harfangs moved to Quebec City and became the Quebec Remparts. Baie-Comeau was granted an expansion team called the Drakkar and played in the Dilio.
1998– Laval Titan Collège-Français moved to Acadie-Bathurst, and played in the Dilio.
1999– Lebel Division became Lebel Conference, and split into the West Division (Hull, Rouyn-Noranda, Montreal, Val-d'Or) and the Central Division (Shawinigan, Drummondville, Sherbrooke, Victoriaville). The Dilio Division became the Dilio Conference and split into the Eastern Division (Rimouski, Quebec City, Baie-Comeau, Chicoutimi) and the Maritime Division (Moncton, Halifax, Cape Breton, Acadie-Bathurst). Montreal Rocket was granted a franchise.
2003– The QMJHL switched to a three-division format: Atlantic (Cape Breton, Moncton, Prince Edward Island, Halifax, Acadie-Bathurst); Eastern (Rimouski, Chicoutimi, Lewiston, Quebec, Baie-Comeau); and Western (Gatineau, Shawinigan, Rouyn-Noranda, Val-d'Or, Drummondville, Victoriaville). Sherbrooke Castors moved to Maine, becoming the Lewiston Maineiacs; Montreal Rocket moved to Charlottetown and took the Prince Edward Island name, Hull Olympiques become Gatineau Olympiques.
2004– The QMJHL announced plans to expand from 16 to 18 teams, effective with the 2005–06 season. St. John's, Newfoundland and Labrador and Saint John, New Brunswick were awarded franchises, the St. John's Fog Devils and Saint John Sea Dogs respectively.
2005– Effective with the 2005–06 season, the league reverted to a two-division format. The East Division consisted of all of the league's non-Québec teams, and the West Division contained all of the Quebec teams.
2006– The Western Division was renamed the Telus Division, under a sponsorship agreement with the Telus Corporation.
2008– The St. John's Fog Devils relocated to Verdun, Quebec to become the Montreal Junior Hockey Club.
2011– The Lewiston Maineiacs were purchased by the league and were dissolved. The remaining roster that's still eligible to play in the QMJHL was claimed by the remaining teams in a dispersal draft.
2011– The Montreal Junior Hockey Club was sold to a group led by former NHL Defencemen Joel Bouchard and renamed the Blainville-Boisbriand Armada.
2012– Sherbrooke permitted to resurrect the former Lewiston franchise as the Phoenix.
2013– The PEI Rocket changed their franchise name to the Charlottetown Islanders.
2020– League returns to a three-division format.

Cities represented

Memorial Cup champions
The Memorial Cup has been captured fourteen times by QMJHL teams since the league's founding in 1969:
1971 – Quebec Remparts
1972 – Cornwall Royals
1980 – Cornwall Royals
1981 – Cornwall Royals
1996 – Granby Prédateurs
1997 – Hull Olympiques
2000 – Rimouski Océanic
2006 – Quebec Remparts
2011 – Saint John Sea Dogs
2012 – Shawinigan Cataractes
2013 – Halifax Mooseheads
2018 – Acadie–Bathurst Titan
2019 – Rouyn-Noranda Huskies
2022 – Saint John Sea Dogs

Trophies and awards
This is a list of QMJHL trophies. The trophy's first season being awarded is shown in brackets.

Team
President's Cup – Playoff Champions (1969–70)
Jean Rougeau Trophy – Regular Season Champions (1969–70)
Luc Robitaille Trophy – Team that scored the most goals (2001–02 to 2013–14), Team with the best goals for average (2014–15)
Robert Lebel Trophy – Team with best GAA (1977–78)

Player
Michel Briere Trophy – Most Valuable Player (1972–73)
Jean Beliveau Trophy – Top Scorer (1969–70)
Guy Lafleur Trophy – Playoff MVP (1977–78)
Telus Cup – Offensive – Offensive Player of the Year (1989–90)
Telus Cup – Defensive – Defensive Player of the Year (1989–90)
Jacques Plante Memorial Trophy – Best GAA (1969–70)
Guy Carbonneau Trophy – Best Defensive Forward (2004–05)
Emile Bouchard Trophy – Defenceman of the Year (1975–76)
Kevin Lowe Trophy – Best Defensive Defenceman (2004–05)
Michael Bossy Trophy – Best Pro Prospect (1980–81)
RDS Cup – Rookie of the Year (1991–92)
Michel Bergeron Trophy – Offensive Rookie of the Year (1969–70)
Raymond Lagacé Trophy – Defensive Rookie of the Year (1980–81)
Frank J. Selke Memorial Trophy – Most Sportsmanlike Player (1969–70)
QMJHL Humanitarian of the Year – Also known as "Wittnauer Plaque" (1992–93)
Marcel Robert Trophy – Best Scholastic Player (1980–81)
Paul Dumont Trophy – Personality of the Year (1989–90)

Executive
Ron Lapointe Trophy – Coach of the Year (1992–93)
Maurice Filion Trophy – General Manager of the Year (2005–06)
John Horman Trophy – Executive of the Year (1989–90)
Jean Sawyer Trophy – Marketing Director of the Year (1990–91)

Defunct trophies
AutoPro Plaque – Best Plus/Minus total (1989–90 to 2001–02)
Philips Plaque – Best faceoff percentage  (1997–98 to 2001–02)

See also
List of ice hockey leagues
List of QMJHL seasons

References

External links

Official website
Canadian Hockey League Official website
Internet Hockey Database Archive of standings and statistics

 
1969 establishments in Quebec
2
1
Sports leagues established in 1969